Muriel Lip (born 25 June 1933) is a French alpine skier. She competed in the women's slalom at the 1956 Winter Olympics.

References

1933 births
Living people
French female alpine skiers
Olympic alpine skiers of France
Alpine skiers at the 1956 Winter Olympics
Place of birth missing (living people)